Cameraria obstrictella is a moth of the family Gracillariidae. It is known from Ontario and Quebec in Canada, and New York, Ohio, Kentucky, Maine, Vermont and Pennsylvania in the United States.

The wingspan is 7–8 mm.

The larvae feed on Quercus species, including Quercus acuminata, Quercus alba, Quercus montana, Quercus muehlenbergii, Quercus rubra, Quercus tinctoria and Quercus velutina, as well as Myrica cerifera. They mine the leaves of their host plant. The mine has the form of a tentiform mine on the upperside of the leaf. The mine is a rather broad Y-shaped tract, sometimes crossing the midrib. The flat, oval, silken cocoon is spun in the leg of the Y.

References

Cameraria (moth)
Moths described in 1859

Moths of North America
Lepidoptera of Canada
Lepidoptera of the United States
Leaf miners
Taxa named by James Brackenridge Clemens